Thomas Horne may refer to:

Thomas Hartwell Horne (1780–1862), English theologian and librarian
Thomas Horne (politician) (1800–1870), Tasmanian judge and politician
Thomas Horne (priest) (died 1636), Anglican priest, Canon of Windsor
Tom Horne (born 1945), Canadian-American attorney, politician, and Republican Party activist 
 Tom Horne (American football), American football coach

See also
Thomas Horn (disambiguation)
Thomas Van Horne (1782–1841), federal land register and Ohio state senator